Lyell Fuller, (born October 22, 1996 in Exeter) is a professional squash player who represents England. He reached a career-high world ranking of World No. 88 in March 2018.

References

External links 

English male squash players
Living people
1996 births